Organizational field is defined as "sets of organizations that, in the aggregate, constitute a recognized area of institutional life; key suppliers, resource
and product consumers, regulatory agencies, and other organizations that produce similar services or products".

See also

 Business cluster
 Institutional memory

References

Organizational theory